Bernardus Joannes Caldenhove (19 January 1914 – 30 July 1983) was a Dutch football defender who played for the Netherlands in the 1938 FIFA World Cup.

Club career
He started playing football for SDZ then joined DWS, where he was made captain when 18 years old.

International career
Caldenhove made his debut for the Netherlands in a March 1935 friendly match against Belgium and earned a total of 25 caps, scoring no goals. His final international was also against Belgium, in March 1940.

References

External links
 
 FIFA profile

1914 births
1983 deaths
Dutch footballers
AFC DWS players
Netherlands international footballers
Association football defenders
1938 FIFA World Cup players
Footballers from Amsterdam